Pollution in Door County, Wisconsin relates to the degree of pollution in the air, water, and land in Door County, Wisconsin. Pollution is defined as the addition of any substance (solid, liquid, or gas) or any form of energy (such as heat, sound, or radioactivity) to the environment at a faster rate than it can be dispersed, diluted, decomposed, recycled, or stored in some harmless form.

Air

Most air pollution reaching the monitor at Newport State Park comes from outside the county. This map shows how air travels to the pollution monitor in Newport State Park. Because the monitor is near the shore, only the red lines (which show the lower air currents) meaningfully depict the path of ozone to the monitor. As shown on the map, these lower currents carry polluted air from major urban areas. But further inland, the air from higher up mixes more, so all color lines are significant when tracing the path of air pollution further inland. These higher currents (shown in green and blue) blow in from cleaner, mostly rural areas.

In 1999, Door County had twice as many days with high ozone as Milwaukee due to the currents. The stability of air over the Lake Michigan shore along with the lake breezes may increase the concentration of ozone along the shoreline.

Nitrous oxide concentrations measured by airplane over county waters are not significantly different than those measured closer to the Chicago area.

In 1972, air pollution was estimated for a new highway bypass and bridge for WIS 42/WIS 57. The estimate assumed that by 1994 there would be 10,900 vehicles per day traveling at 60 miles per hour, which would generate 0.68 μg/m of hydrocarbons, 0.00505 ppm of carbon monoxide, 0.0011 ppm , 0.00076 ppm oxides of sulfur, and 2.06 μg/m of particulates as measured from an area 60 meters (195 feet) downwind of the new highway and bridge on a day with a slight wind. These projected emissions fell within the existing federal air quality standards. In 2020, a traffic counter near the Bay View Bridge recorded an average of 12,500 daily vehicles. Pollution modeling predicts the presence of locally generated air pollution associated with vehicular traffic in the city of Sturgeon Bay.

In 2002, an air pollution monitor in the county reported an average particulate level of 7.5μg/m, less than reported for Brown and Manitowoc counties, but higher than Vilas County.

Trees growing in urban areas remove pollution from the air. In 2001, tree canopy coverage in developed areas was compiled for 3,109 counties by the US Forest Service. Door County ranked 22nd highest in the state and 1,062nd highest nationally for tree cover in developed areas. 15.1% of the county's developed areas were covered with tree canopies and the county received a Resource Planning Act assessment of "fair" for its urban forest.

In 2022, the Environmental Protection Agency decided that the northern part of the county met its standard for ozone.

Wells, soils, and surface waters

19th century 
Water-borne diseases were historically significant in the county. The Belgian migration to the county largely ceased after word of the 1856 cholera epidemic in Door County reached Europe. From 1859 to 1880, more than ten percent of all recorded deaths in the county were caused by dysentery or diarrhea. Death from dysentery or diarrhea was more common in the summer due food and water contamination.

Aquifers and springs background

Aquifers

Door County has three types of aquifers. The newest is in a relatively shallow layer of sand and gravel, but tends to not to provide enough water except in the southeastern part of the county. Further down are layers of dolomite bedrock that are recharged by water percolating from the layer of sand and gravel. Past the dolomite is a layer of shale that typically does not contain water, although potentially it is a source of oil. Past the shale is a layer of sandstone that is also host to a bedrock aquifer. Only a few wells tap this deepest and oldest aquifer. Due to the tilt of the layers and erosion, there are areas of the county missing certain layers. A study of three city wells serving Sturgeon Bay found that water from the surface fell anywhere from 13 to 115 feet per day from the surface down to the dolomite aquifer. When the snow melted in the spring, the water coming up from one well changed 9 days later to reflect the character of the new meltwater.

Springs
Groundwater burbles up from the shallow aquifer through the fractured bedrock, forming fracture springs. It also may seep more slowly through the ground, forming seepage springs. Detailed measurements were taken of one fracture and three seepage springs during a 2014–2017 survey. Although the fracture spring had large variations in output, it still had a greater flow rate than the other 409 springs surveyed. It had one of the highest specific conductance measurements (995 µS/cm) among the springs studied, due to the minerals dissolved in the water. A study of wells, springs, and surface waters in six county wetlands took samples from September 2017 to June 2018. Enterococci were found in all of the surface waters and six of the eight springs, but not either of the two wells. An earlier study comparing spring water and well water from five springs and 47 wells in Sevastopol found that spring water was more turbid than well water and more likely to be contaminated by coliform bacteria. Nitrates, chloride, and specific conductance were not significantly different between the springs and wells.

Wells 

The combination of shallow soils and fractured bedrock makes well water contamination more likely. At any given time, at least one-third of private wells may contain bacteria, and in situations with quickly flowing underground water, wells may test clean one day but contaminated the next. Some household wells turn brown every spring from nearby manure applications. Bacterial contamination of wells is more likely in the summer due to the larger human population. In wells that are contaminated, bacterial concentrations peak during following rains in the late summer and early fall.

Nearly all soil types in the county which have received a rating for their overall suitability for septic systems are considered to be "very limited" in their utility for septic systems. Out of 292 different combinations of soil associations and types in the county, 124 soil classifications are assigned a "very limited" rating, 4 are assigned a "somewhat limited" rating, and 164 have not been rated. The four which are "somewhat limited" are uncommon in the county. Additionally, certain soil types are especially prone to leeching contaminants into the groundwater. Out of the 74 different total soil types present in the county, 44 types are known to be more susceptible to leaching contaminants into groundwater than typical soils. Out of the 44 more susceptible types, 22 are more susceptible to leaching when the water table is less than 12 inches from the surface, 10 are more susceptible to leaching when the soil is less than 20 inches above the bedrock, and 14 are regarded to be highly permeable soils. Some of the 44 more susceptible soil types have a combination of these characteristics.

From 1916 to 1926 there were six documented outbreaks of typhoid fever in the county, which were thought to be from contaminated water.

In 1955, the U.S. Public Health Service was concerned about the high incidence of dysentery or "summer diarrhea" among tourists and both seasonal and year-round county residents. Weekly samples were taken during the tourist season from 27 wells belonging to establishments serving the public. 51.9% of the wells tested positive for coliform bacteria on at least once during the study, with 19.8% of all samples taken testing positive.

Chlorinators were installed at eight hotels and restaurants and another study was conducted in 1957, with 62.1% of the original 27 wells (along with two additional wells) testing positive for coliform bacteria at least once, with 12.6% of all samples taken testing positive for coliform bacteria. Only one of the eight chlorinated establishments had negative samples throughout the study. It was concluded that chlorination was ineffective, and the old requirement that wells have 40 feet of casing was replaced with a new 100-foot casing requirement for most places in the county. Samples taken in the years immediately following this study indicated that deeper well casing reduced the risk a well would test positive for coliform bacteria.

From 1961-1964, a total of twenty migrant worker camps had been closed for unsafe drinking water. In 1964, the owners of seven previously-closed camps were permitted to re-open on the condition they immediately provide chlorinated water and also sign contract for new wells. All seven failed to drill new wells for the 1965 season, which saw a total of 36 migrant camps closed that year for unsafe drinking water or other sanitary reasons. Fifteen were permitted to re-open on the condition they provide chlorinated water, but only two of the fifteen fulfilled their obligation. Similar issues at the camps continued until 1969.

In 1968, 44 people on Washington Island were sickened with hepatitis, a food and water-borne disease, and one girl died. 

After the Milwaukee Journal published an Insight article about septic system problems in the county in 1971, 28% of tourists surveyed in person and 57% of tourists surveyed by telephone reported having read the article. 13% of tourists surveyed by phone said that if water pollution increased, they would stop visiting the county. But the Chamber of Commerce spokesman and one other resort owner said they thought the publicity was good advertising. 14 out of 15 resort owners surveyed said their business had not declined from the previous year, although six thought the article hurt tourism and two thought their businesses had been negatively affected. A study found that those who thought bad water was the county's main problem were less likely to return, and that the water quality problem was hurting tourism. A large study of wells in the county was carried out in response to the Insight article. It was found that 15.8% of all wells tested positive for coliform bacteria, but for wells with 100 feet or more of casing, only 10.1% tested positive. Following this, new wells in most of the county were required to have 170 feet of casing or more.

The porous and fractured dolomite bedrock was implicated as a factor in a June 2007 epidemic when 239 patrons and 18 employees of the newly opened Log Den restaurant were sickened by a norovirus. Six were hospitalized. The virus was found to have traveled from a septic field 188 m (617 ft) away to the restaurant's well, contaminating their water. From September to December 2007 a study was conducted in which dyes were placed into the septic system. The dyes traveled through the groundwater at about 2 miles per year, and researchers concluded that viral contaminants could travel "many miles in their life times." For transient non-community public wells such as the one supplying the restaurant, state only regulated for contaminants within a 200-foot radius unless  flow studies had previously been done. Modeling research supporting this decision predicted that pathogens would be unlikely to travel more than 155 feet per year.

In September 2014, 16 people feel ill from drinking wellwater after rainwater washed manure went down a sinkhole in Jacksonport.

Short-term rentals are thought to contaminate the groundwater whenever more people stay in a house or cottage than the septic system was designed to handle.

Soils and groundwater 

The Wisconsin Department of Natural Resources reports 137 leaking underground storage tank sites, 385 spill locations, and 104 other areas involving contamination, such as of soils and groundwater, including 24 cases which polluted one or more neighboring properties and 82 open cases such as cherry orchards left with arsenic and lead-contaminated soils from pesticide use during the 1960s and earlier. Additionally, two landowners voluntarily cooperated with the DNR, limiting their future liability. 

As of 1986, 38 pesticide mixing sites were located. 308 nearby wells were tested for lead, which was found in 32% of them. Eight wells exceeded the federal drinking water standard at the time of 50 parts-per-billion. Lead and copper contamination was also detected, which corresponded with the lead arsenate and copper(II) sulfate mixture used in sprays. Contamination was concentrated in three zones on the Green Bay side of the peninsula in the towns of Sevastopol, Egg Harbor, and Liberty Grove, although not all wells in these areas were contaminated, and contamination was also found outside the three zones. The distribution of contaminated wells was affected by the thin soils and the location of fractures in the bedrock. Sometimes a well near a pesticide mixing site was uncontaminated, while a more distant will was contaminated. This was explained by the wells drawing water from different aquifers. This uneven distribution pattern complicated efforts to determine the sources of pollution and the extent of the problem. The degree of lead contamination detected in a well varies over time, with some relationship to recent precipitation.

At the peak of fruit production in the 1940s–1950s there were about 12,000 acres of orchards, about 3.9% of the 482 square miles of land in the county. Mines, prior landfills, and former orchard sites are considered impaired lands and specially marked on an electronic county map.  A different electronic map shows the locations of private wells polluted with lead, arsenic, copper, and other contaminants down to the section level. A 2020 study sampling 237 private wells found one with a concentration higher than the federal standard. Certain areas appeared to have higher concentrations of arsenic than others.

Creeks and Ahnapee River
A 2017 study looking at the impacts of nutrient pollution on microbes used DNA analysis to detect human pathogens in May Creek, Keyes Creek, and Sugar Creek during the months of May, September, and October. Aeromonas sobria was detected in May, September, and October, while Pseudomonas alcaligenes was only detected in September. Both species of bacteria are chemoheterotrophs which feed on organic material in the water.

In 2016–2017, water was tested for pharmaceutical chemicals, with samples coming from May Creek, Keyes Creek, and Sugar Creek, and also from the Ahnapee River at the intersection with County Trunk H. The tests found caffeine and acetaminophen in the Ahnapee River, and also the psychiatric drugs fluoxetine and carbamazepine and the antimicrobial triclocarban. Caffeine and carbamazepine were both found in May Creek. Caffeine was found in Keyes Creek and carbamazepine was found in Sugar Creek.

In Green Bay 

A counterclockwise circulation of water along the surface of Green Bay is thought to carry cleaner water south along the western shore of the bay, and nutrient-rich water from the Fox River north along the eastern shore of the bay. The circulation is thought to begin south of the mouth of the Oconto River on the west side. It changes direction at Pensaukee, north of Long Tail Point and continues northward to Sturgeon Bay. The position of Long Tail Point marks the east-west division between the two masses of water.

Turbidity 
It appears that turbidity in Green Bay is higher than in the past, and that at least some of it is due to human impacts. The passage of large ships causes turbulence in the water to an extent comparable to dredging. Additionally, carp in the bay are known to uproot vegetation which could otherwise filter sediments suspended in the water. When storms stir up water in the bay, microorganisms feed more rapidly on the nutrients. This temporarily depletes oxygen levels.

A 1985 study looking at Rowleys Bay, North Bay, and Moonlight Bay found that turbidity directly influenced the productivity of aquatic plants. In areas with the greatest turbidity, the total biomass was considerably lower. Carp were the main source of turbidity in waters near the shore.

Bioaccumulation 
PCBs from Green Bay have been deposited into the county as windborne dust and off of contaminated waters. The state lists 6.85 miles of the Ahnapee River in Door County as an impaired waterway due to PCB pollution, a designation extending past the county line.

In 1975, PCBs were found in the eggs of red-breasted and common merganser ducks in the county and were implicated along with DDE and mercury as possible explanations for eggshell thinning.

In 1979, women on Washington Island were tested for PCBs, and concentrations above 5 ppm were found in some of the samples of their breast milk. Data from five of the 28 women studied in 1979 was described in detail as part of another study. The five women had blood serum PCB concentrations ranging from 15.4 ppb to 22.8 ppb, with a mean of 19.54 ppb. Three of the five women ate somewhat more than 8 ounces of fish per week, adding up to an average of 30 pounds annually. The woman with a blood serum concentration of 15.4 ppb did not consume any fish. Two of the five women were breastfeeding, and both of their milkfat PCB concentrations tested at 3.7 ppm.

Walleye found in the Sturgeon Bay and Little Sturgeon area had 87% more PCBs than walleye from the western side of Green Bay at the mouth of the Oconto River. This fits what is known about the distribution of PCBs which spread from industries in the Fox River Valley.

In 1962, 71,533 pounds of DDT was applied in Door County, which accounted for 17% of the total used in the state as a whole. In 1964 on Little Sister Island only 41% of herring gull eggs hatched. High levels of DDT were found to be the main cause of death among the unhatched chicks. In 1964, DDT use dropped sharply compared to the year before as growers switched to using Sevin (carbaryl) instead. In 1969, Green Bay District Fish Manager Lee Kernan for the Wisconsin Department of Natural Resources estimated that if DDT was banned, "it would take Lake Michigan 10 or 15 years to recover" and that "Most human beings in this area are walking around with 12 ppm in their bodies."

Salinification 
Between 1996 and 2006, impervious surfaces in the county increased by 0.6 square miles (about 400 acres). In 2006 a total of 1% of all land in the county was paved. Over the same period, 0.8 square miles (about 500 acres) were deforested and 0.6 square miles were lost to agriculture. As development increases water quality is expected to worsen and the risk of flooding is expected to increase. 
During the 2020 to 2021 winter season, 3,266 tons of salt and 178,000 gallons of brine were applied to state, county, and town roads. Road salt has been credited with fostering the growth of salt tolerant Phragmites australis (giant cane) and Typha angustifolia (narrowleaved cattail) in roadside ditches. Across the Great Lakes region, roadside salt spread within 500 meters of lake has been credited with increasing the salinity of the lakewater.

Beach contamination 
32 beaches are routinely monitored for water quality advisories. Before the state beach monitoring program, an outbreak at Nicolet Beach in Peninsula State Park sickened 68 or 69 people in July 2002. A two-year study of selected Door County beaches concluded that neither the abundance of bird droppings nor bird populations reliably predicted E. coli contamination, although rainfall was associated with elevated E. coli levels in six out of eight beaches studied. After a rain, E. coli counts may increase up to three times the normal amount and persist at a higher concentration for up to 12 hours. This could be due to increased stormwater drainage, including possible agricultural waste runoff. From 2011–2015, a beach improvement program worked to reduce runoff.

Mats of Cladophora algae provide homes for Salmonella bacteria.

Agricultural nonpoint source pollution 
In 2017, farmers spent $2,825,000 on agricultural chemicals, in addition to $5,295,000 on fertilizer, lime, and soil conditioners; as a result agricultural practices are a potential source of nonpoint-source pollution.

Social responses 
Jim Cook, an Egg Harbor business owner, predicted in 1984 that pollution would determine the eventual carrying capacity of Door County, but the carrying capacity could be raised if local governments became strict about controlling new development projects.

A 2008 survey of county residents found that 93% of respondents not skipping the question thought that requiring and managing "Sanitary permits for all private sewage disposal systems constructed within Door County" was of medium or higher importance and 86% thought that the county sanitarian division be "Involved with other environmental health problems associated with the County" was of medium or higher importance.

A 2009 study of Union, Gardener, and Nasewaupee property owners along with property owners in townships from other counties along southern Green Bay found that people owning bayfront properties valued a reduction in nonpoint source pollution more strongly than those owning properties further inland. Another factor motivating opposition to nonpoint source pollution in the county has been a desire to have a suburban rather than agricultural neighborhood environment.

See also 
 Avgas (with tetraethyl lead)
 Sherwin-Williams § New Jersey pollution lawsuit; the company agreed to pay about $14 million to clean up lead arsenate contamination and other pollutants.
 :File:Sherwin-Williams brand Lime Sulphur and Arsenate of Lead advertisement 1911 Door County Democrat.jpg
 Door County, Wisconsin § Air
 Pollution in the United States
 PCBs in the United States
 Water pollution in the United States
 Regulation of ship pollution in the United States
 United States environmental law

Notes

References

External links 
 Lead and Arsenic in Soil at Old Fruit Orchards: Frequently Asked Questions, January 2012, Wisconsin DATCP
EPA air-quality concerns reach Door County, January 31, 2017, USA-Today Network-Wisconsin
Interactive Map of Air Quality, Northeast Wisconsin, Environmental Protection Agency (Has real-time ozone readings from the monitor at Newport State Park.)
Door County gets 'F' in American Lung Association annual report, April 27, 2018, Green Bay Press Gazette
Administrator Wheeler Announces Cleaner Air in Sheboygan and Door Counties, Wisconsin, June 16, 2020, EPA News Releases
Monitor move shows county air quality good, July 1, 2020, Sheboygan Beacon
Door County's High Pollution, August 1, 2000, WTMJ Milwaukee 2:42 segment, mirrored on msn.com lifestyle

Pollution in the United States
Door County, Wisconsin